The Maragall Government was the regional government of Catalonia led by President Pasqual Maragall between 2003 and 2006. It was formed in December 2003 following the regional election and ended in November 2006 following the regional election.

Executive Council

Commissions
Since 25 October 2005 to the end of the term of office, the day-by-day working plan of the government was ruled by its division into commissions. All the commissions were chaired by the First Minister, but eventually another minister could rule as. Its initial composition was:

After the last government restructuration (15 May 2006, when ERC ministers were expelled from the government) the composition became:

Notes

References
 

2003 establishments in Catalonia
2006 disestablishments in Catalonia
Cabinets established in 2003
Cabinets disestablished in 2006
Cabinets of Catalonia